The Kent Police and Crime Commissioner is an elected official tasked with setting out the way crime is tackled by Kent Police in the English County of Kent. The post was created following an election held on 15 November 2012, and replaced the Kent Police Authority. The current incumbent is Matthew Scott, who represents the Conservative Party.

List of Kent Police and Crime Commissioners

References

Police and crime commissioners in England